Creswell and Welbeck railway station used to serve the village of Creswell, in north eastern  Derbyshire, England.

See also
Three stations have included a version of "Creswell" in their name:
 Creswell and Welbeck, which is the subject of this article,
 , formerly known as "Elmton & Creswell", which is on the same street as Creswell and Welbeck, and
  in Staffordshire

History
The station was opened by the LD&ECR on its Beighton Branch on 1 June 1897. At first it was named simply "Cresswell" then "Creswell for Welbeck" and later "Creswell and Welbeck". Locally it was known as "Top Station" to distinguish it from "Bottom Station" which was the ex-Midland Railway Elmton and Creswell station further down Elmton Road. The August 1939 Bradshaw continued to list the station as "Cresswell and Welbeck."

The station had wooden platforms and appears from one of the rare photographs of the site to have been built of wood.

From Langwith Junction the line ran northwards parallel to the Midland Railway's Nottingham Midland to Worksop line for about two miles, then veered north west to Creswell.
Curiously, "Elmton and Creswell" station was nearer Welbeck than "Creswell and Welbeck" station which was in turn nearer Elmton than "Elmton and Creswell".

The station closed to passengers in September 1939, and goods some time thereafter. The station signalbox, which had a Railway Signalling Company 28 lever frame, was abolished on 4 April 1950.

The line through the site was closed completely in 1967 when it was diverted further South and severed further North in connection with building the M1 motorway. All tracks have since been lifted and the station demolished, though the characteristic LD&ECR stationmaster's house still stands, as can be seen on the accompanying photograph.

Stationmasters
Ephraim Russon 1897 - 1930
Lewis Geradine 1930 - 1939 (formerly station master at Navenby)

References

Notes

Sources

External links
 Creswell stations on old OS map npemaps
 
 
 

Disused railway stations in Derbyshire
Former Lancashire, Derbyshire and East Coast Railway stations
Railway stations in Great Britain opened in 1897
Railway stations in Great Britain closed in 1939